Samuel Goldman (November 9, 1916 – November 8, 1978) was an American football end who played professionally for the Boston Yanks, Chicago Cardinals, and Detroit Lions of the National Football League.  Born in Cleveland, Ohio, Goldman played college football at Samford University and Ohio State University. He stood 6'3" and weighed 228 pounds.

References

External links
 

1916 births
1978 deaths
American football ends
Boston Yanks players
Camp Grant Warriors football players
Chicago Cardinals players
Detroit Lions players
Fort Riley Centaurs football players
Ohio State Buckeyes football players
Samford Bulldogs football players
Players of American football from Cleveland